is a road cyclist from Japan. She represented her nation in the Women's road race at the 2004 Summer Olympics. She became Japanese Time Trial Champion in 2004 and 2005. She also rode at the 2005 UCI Road World Championships.

References

External links
 profile at Procyclingstats.com

Japanese female cyclists
Living people
Place of birth missing (living people)
1974 births
Cyclists at the 2004 Summer Olympics
Olympic cyclists of Japan
Cyclists at the 2006 Asian Games
Cyclists at the 2018 Asian Games
Asian Games competitors for Japan
20th-century Japanese women
21st-century Japanese women